Otto Graf (8 March 1892 – 1 September 1971) was a German politician of the Social Democratic Party (SPD) and member of the German Bundestag.

Life 
In 1949 Graf became a member of the German Bundestag as a directly elected SPD candidate in the Munich-West constituency, to which he belonged in the first legislative period.

Literature

References

1892 births
1971 deaths
Members of the Bundestag for Bavaria
Members of the Bundestag 1949–1953
Members of the Bundestag for the Social Democratic Party of Germany